Atascosa is a genus of snout moths. It was described by George Duryea Hulst in 1890 and is known from the US state of Texas and Colombia.

Species
 Atascosa glareosella (Zeller, 1872)
 Atascosa heitzmani Shaffer, 1980
 Atascosa verecundella (Hampson, 1901)

References

Anerastiini
Pyralidae genera